Love Marriage is 2015 Bangladeshi romantic drama film. The film directed by Shahin Sumon and produced by Taposhi Faruque under the banner of Heartbeat Production. The film feature Shakib Khan and Apu Biswas in the lead roles. Misha Sawdagor, Sadek Bachchu, Ahmed Sharif and Mizu Ahmed also played supporting roles in the film.

Cast
 Shakib Khan as Naya Sawdagar aka Nayan
 Apu Biswas as Monica
 Misha Sawdagor
 Sadek Bachchu
 Ahmed Sharif
 Mizu Ahmed
 Kabila
 Shirin Bakul as Nayan's mother
 Bipasha Kabir (special appearance)

Production
The film muharat held on March 10, 2015 in Shakib Khan’s house Jannat House in Pubali. The film principal photography on the same day. The first lot was complete for five consecutive days till March 15. Then, on March 18, the entire shooting unit of the film moved to Cox's Bazar. The next day, the climax of the film and some songs were filmed in Cox's Bazar for 8 consecutive days from 19 to 26 March.

Release
The film released on 18 July 2015 in 123 theatres all over the country.

References

External links
 

Bengali-language Bangladeshi films
2010s Bengali-language films
2015 films
2015 romantic comedy-drama films
Bangladeshi romantic comedy-drama films
Films scored by Hridoy Khan